MacQueen's bustard (Chlamydotis macqueenii) is a large bird in the bustard family. It is native to the desert and steppe regions of Asia, west from the Sinai Peninsula extending across Kazakhstan east to Mongolia. In the 19th century, vagrants were found as far west of their range as Great Britain. Populations have decreased by 20 to 50% between 1984 and 2004 mainly due to hunting and changes in land-use. MacQueen's bustard is a partial latitudinal migrant while the houbara bustard (C. undulata) is more sedentary. Both species are the only members of the genus Chlamydotis. MacQueen's bustard used to be regarded as a subspecies of the houbara bustard and known as the "Asian houbara".

Taxonomy

Otis macqueenii was proposed by John Edward Gray in 1834 for a bustard from India drawn by Thomas Hardwicke.
It was long regarded a subspecies of the African houbara bustard Chlamydotis undulata. It was classified as a distinct species in 2003.

The genus name Chlamydotis is from Ancient Greek khlamus, a horseman's cloak with weights sewn into the corners, and otis, bustard.

MacQueen's bustard is larger than the houbara and much paler. The feathers on the top of the head include some long and curved feathers which are white or black with white bases. In the houbara, these crest feathers are all white and the difference is evident during the display of the male. The lack of intermediate forms in the region where the ranges of MacQueen's bustard and houbara bustard meet, presumed to be in the Nile valley, differences in morphology and display behaviour led to their being elevated to full species. The houbara bustard now refers only to the North African population, included as the nominate subspecies C. undulata undulata and a small population on the Canary Islands (C. u. fuertaventurae).

Estimates based on the divergence of mitochondrial DNA sequence suggest that the species separated from the common ancestors of C. u. undulata and C. u. fuertaventurae nearly 430,000 years ago. This divergence may have begun 900,000 years ago, at a time of extreme aridity. The wide dispersal abilities of MacQueen's bustard ensure that their genes are more well mixed unlike the geographically structured genetic patterns shown by the African houbara.

Description
It is brown above and white below, with black stripes down the sides of the neck. In flight, the long wings show large areas of black and brown on the flight feathers and a white patch at the base of the primaries. From below the wing is mostly white with a black trailing edge. Sexes are similar, but the female is smaller and paler above.

Males and females are nearly identical in plumage but males are slightly larger than females. A study of the morphometrics of MacQueen's bustards from Pakistan based on about 79 individuals of known sex showed that the males were 9 to 15% larger than females on most measurements. The use of discriminant analysis allowed correct identification of the sexes based on morphometrics in about 99% of the cases.

MacQueen's bustard is very silent except for the sounds that males make in their display. Like other bustards, they have a flamboyant display, raising the white feathers of the head and throat and withdrawing the head while walking around a chosen lek site.

Distribution and habitat
MacQueen's bustard occurs from the east of the Sinai Peninsula to the Caspian Sea and extending east to the Gobi Desert in Mongolia. Birds from the northern populations winter further south in Pakistan (mainly in western Balochistan) and in the dry arid zone of western India. Vagrants have historically been found as far west and north as Britain and as far south as northern Kerala (Kanhangad). A bird was shot in 1847 at Lincolnshire, Yorkshire in 1898, and another in Aberdeenshire in 1898 all in the month of October. Possibly the last of these vagrants visited Suffolk in November–December 1962. This species breeds in deserts and other very arid sandy areas. A study of their habitat in Saudi Arabia found the species to be very dependent on good vegetation cover and tended to be found in areas with dense growth of scrub vegetation, particularly Capparis spinosa. A study in the steppes of Iran found that nest sites were chosen mainly in locations with high densities of insect prey which in turn were related to vegetation characteristics.

Migration 
Their migrations have been tracked using satellite transmitters. Mongolian birds leave the wintering areas in Afghanistan and Pakistan from mid to late March and arrive in their breeding grounds after about two months of flying, taking a path that avoids the high mountains of the Himalayas. They spend about four months in their breeding territories before setting off again and reach their winter grounds from October to December.

Satellite tracking of 48 individual houbaras across multiple migrations showed that this species uses the local temperature to time their spring migration departure.

Behaviour and ecology 

The male houbara displays initially with the neck upright and the feathers on the base of the neck erected. A few feathers on the head are also erected while walking slowly, with one foot moved carefully and placed just ahead of the other. This is followed by a more vigorous phase of running either in a line or in a circle around a few bushes while the neck is tucked back into an "S". The neck feathers are erected and cover the head. The feet are raised in a measured gait and the neck is swayed from side to side. A low sound of breathing may be heard but only at very close. Males will call during display and if there are no potential mates, the display may be repeated. When a mate appears to be receptive, the male puffs up the black feathers on the sides of the neck so that it appears like a black collar or ruff and walks towards the female while twisting his body from side to side. The males mate with multiple females and after mating, the female alone builds the nest and incubates. The clutch consists of 2–4 eggs laid in a bare scrape on the ground. The eggs hatch after about 23 days and as in all bustards, the nidifugous chicks leave the nest immediately after hatching and follow the mother which picks insects and passes them to the chicks with her beak. The young fledge in about 30 days but remain close to their mother for several months.

When pursued by falcons (such as the saker falcon or peregrine falcon) in falconry, the bustard rises into the air and spirals to avoid being struck. It has been claimed that it also defends itself by defecating on the falcon, the sticky green faeces causing the falcon to crash to the ground with wings stuck.

This species is omnivorous taking seeds, berries, insects and other invertebrates. They do not drink water and obtain all the moisture they need from their diet. Tenebrionid beetles were found to be especially numerous in one study. Plant material makes up more of their diet during the non-breeding season.

Threats
The species was once nearly hunted to near-extinction in the Middle East by Arab falconers, hunters and poachers. It was considered great sport in colonial India, especially to hunt tiloor (the local name) from camel back. The bird would be approached in narrowing circles and on close approach the bustard would squat on the ground and conceal itself. The introduction of jeeps and guns however led to a drastic decline in the population of the species. Hunts in some parts of Pakistan have been organized for wealthy Arabs who purchase permits to hunt a limited number of birds but routinely exceed quotas. The meat of this bustard is considered in the Arab world to be an aphrodisiac and a diuretic according to another source.

Rapid population declines of about 50% were seen in their breeding grounds in Kazakhstan between 1998 and 2002 and thought to be due to hunting, especially in their winter grounds.
Annual declines over a ten-year period across Asia were estimated at around 27–30% in 2004. The main threat to the species is degradation of semi-desert habitat by the introduction of agriculture and by infrastructure development such as roads and electricity, which are responsible for increased mortality of birds. They also are at considerable risk during migration from heavy poaching as well as a lack of suitable habitats along their migration routes due to development.
It is very sensitive to disturbance by humans and livestock when nesting. A study in Uzbekistan found that sheep grazing did not disturb the MacQueen's usage of non-breeding habitats.

Conservation 
Conservation efforts were made across the region after the 1970s with international conservation organizations working along with local governments. Some captive breeding facilities were created including one in Saudi Arabia in 1986 and have been successful in captive breeding since the late 1990s, initially by incubating eggs collected from the wild and later entirely in captivity using artificial insemination. Captive-bred birds are considerably more inbred and may be susceptible to diseases.

Being migratory species, it is important that captive-bred bustards undertake similar migrations as wild birds. Comparing the migrations of captive and wild birds using satellite telemetry, it was found that captive-bred individuals started autumn migration later and wintered closer to the breeding grounds than wild individuals. The surviving captive-bred bustards were also faithful in their wintering locations in subsequent years. As migration has a genetic component, it is important to consider migratory population structure, as well as natal and release-site fidelity, during captive breeding management of this species.

The bird is protected in the United Arab Emirates. In February 2019, 50 birds were released into the desert in Al-Ain Region in the Emirate of Abu Dhabi, to help conserve the birds and increase their number in the wild.

References

External links

 National Wildlife Research Centre, Saudi Arabia
 
 
 
 

MacQueen's bustard
Birds of Central Asia
Birds of Pakistan
Birds of the Middle East
Birds of Mongolia
MacQueen's bustard
MacQueen's bustard